Nevelson is a surname. Notable people with the surname include:

 Louise Nevelson (1899–1988), Ukrainian-born American sculptor
 Neith Nevelson (born 1946), American painter